Neil Glat is an American businessman and sports executive who is a senior advisor for the New York Jets of the National Football League (NFL). He graduated from Wharton School of Business and Harvard Law School.

On August 30, 2019, Glat stepped down as team president of the New York Jets and would transition into a senior advisor role.

References

Year of birth missing (living people)
Living people
New York Jets executives
National Football League team presidents
Wharton School of the University of Pennsylvania alumni
Harvard Law School alumni